is a 1987 anime/live-action film written and directed by Hiroaki Yoshida that combines live-action footage with animation. The plot concerns a society of cockroaches who live peacefully in the apartment of a bachelor named Saito, until a woman moves in and the humans begin to exterminate the cockroaches. The cockroaches are depicted through animation, and the humans are depicted through live-action footage.

Director Yoshida has stated that the film is "about Japan" and that the "concept of a 'hated' species is like the racial and cultural enmity with which Japan is perceived". In his New York Times review, Vincent Canby wrote: "The publicity material for Twilight of the Cockroaches describes the film as an allegory about the fate in store for affluent Japan if it doesn't meet its international responsibilities. The film may read that way in Japan. In this country, it looks somewhat darker and more muddled".

The English dub of the film was produced by Streamline Pictures. During the early-to-mid 1990s, the film was shown frequently on Turner Broadcasting stations such as TBS, TNT and Cartoon Network, often paired with Vampire Hunter D and Robot Carnival. As a result, it was one of the first exposures to anime for many American anime fans.

The soundtrack is by Morgan Fisher.

The film was originally released on VHS and LaserDisc by Lumivision in 1991.

The film was released on to DVD by Discotek Media on February 26, 2019.

Plot
The movie focuses on a large tribe of cockroaches called the Hosino Tribe, who live in an apartment owned by a human the roaches call Mr. Saito. Saito lives by himself and is seen to be very messy, making it ideal for the roaches. Saito knows about the roach infestation but does not care to do anything about them, and the roaches view Saito as a benefactor. They live in luxury, neglecting their traditional abilities and living without caution. They are led by a roach named Sage/Professor, who advises them on matters and states he negotiates with Saito on any issues. In the past, the Hosino tribe had a war against the humans which ended when the then human occupants left and Saito arrived. The Hosino roaches call this Armistice Day.

Ichiro and Naomi are two cockroaches in the tribe, engaged and planning a wedding. Naomi is having doubts about the relationship. One evening, a roach from another far off tribe called Hans arrive, injured from a battle.  Naomi falls in love with him. After recuperating and informing the Hosino tribe of his war, Hans leaves to go back to his tribe. Naomi follows him in secret, with Ichiro unaware. Naomi arrives at another apartment, owned by a woman named Momoko. Naomi begins to kindly ask the towering woman for her help in finding her friend, Momoko immediately displays her violent and cruel nature as she ignores the plea and tries to stomp on the helpless little Naomi. Momoko is so determined that she literally starts crawling with a rolled up newspaper on the ground to squash one cockroach, but Naomi luckily escaped. Momoko and Hans' militaristic tribe are at war with each other, with Hans' tribe launching attacks on Momoko to get food and Momoko retaliating by killing the roaches with insecticides.

Naomi and Hans are reunited, and three weeks pass with them staying together. One evening, Saito and Momoko notice each other from across the apartment complex and soon start seeing each other, though the Hosino roaches are unaware of her. During one visit, Naomi inadvertently returns to Saito's apartment, having hidden in Momoko's purse after a horrific experience in a roach motel. Ichiro and Naomi are reunited, with Naomi telling Ichiro she has amnesia and doesn't remember being gone. They proceed with their wedding.

Before Naomi can finish her vows, the wedding is disrupted by Momoko, who attacks and kills many of them. Naomi and Ichiro escape. Their leader, Sage, says he will discuss this unprovoked attack with Saito. The next day, he is found dead, pinned to a dart on a dart board. Momoko and Saito start mass exterminating the roaches. The Hosino roaches, having not encountered this in several generations, are taken by surprise and many are killed. Meanwhile, Naomi reveals to Ichiro's Grandfather that she is pregnant, but doesn't know if the litter is Ichiro's or Hans', and believes it to be the latter. Grandfather tells her it is likely a mix of both. It is also revealed Armistice Day is a lie and Saito only tolerates the roaches because he became depressed after his wife and children left him.

The elderly roaches, who remember a time before peace, teach the rest how to forage and steal dropped food, but the roaches grow hungry. Eventually, Hans's tribe arrives, intending to invade, but after learning that the Hosino tribe no longer has any food, agrees to help them. They set out to drive out the humans using their superior numbers. In response, Saito and Momoko resolve to kill all the roaches at once, setting off many bug bombs and spraying all around the apartment. Momoko, who has more of a personal rivalry with the cockroaches and a strong dislike to their species decides to squish some of them under the massive weight of her foot. The moment her giant heavy foot slams down on the wooden floor, the bugs are crushed within mere seconds along with her ankle bracelet dangling. The impact of the stomp was so great that it caused a loud earthquake under the weight of Momoko. As the dead roaches lay stuck under the odorly skin of a female human's barefoot, Momoko lets out a terrifying rage filled scream. Later on, an unconscious Momoko awakens to notice a roach feasting on her leftover sandwich that she littered on the floor, she slowly gets closer and proceeds to crush the roach along with the sandwich under the weight of her giant hand. The leader of Hans' tribe tells him to escape, as it is believed Hans is the savior of the tribe. As he flees, Hans is killed by a falling book dropped by Momoko.

Naomi and Ichiro are some of the few survivors of the onslaught. Naomi receives a vision of her grandmother telling Naomi she is immune to the insecticides and that she will pass this to her children. Naomi tells Ichiro to escape and meet her at a nearby shrine (actually a toy abandoned in the apartment yard complex), where they will start a new life away from humans. As they escape, Naomi is seemingly killed with insecticides, and Ichiro is shot to death with an air soft gun as he flies away.

Naomi is shown to survive, her vision of being immune proving true. The epilogue shows her with a huge litter of children, all seemingly immune to insecticides. Some of her children looks like Ichiro and Hans, meaning that both were fathers to a new generation of roaches.

Voice actors
Atsuko Asano as Naomi
Ichiro Miyakawa as Ichiro
Mitsuru Hirata as Yasuo
Hiroshi Yagyu as Seiji
Ryoko Takakura as Parsley
Toshio Furukawa as Fritz
Keisuke Ootori as Kosuke
Takashi Kusaka as Alois
Kozo Shioya as Takashi
Tanie Kitabayashi as Torah
Mitsutoshi Ishigami as Grump
Masato Tsujimura as Kantaro
Masato Furuoya as Hans

Live action actors
Kaoru Kobayashi as Saito

Setsuko Karasuma as Momoko

See also
Joe's Apartment

References

External links

1987 anime films
Anime with original screenplays
Discotek Media
Fictional cockroaches
Animated films about insects
Films with live action and animation
Japanese animated films
Madhouse (company)